Laurent Victor Louis Émile Leredde (26 October 1866, Paris – 1926) was a French physician, specialising in dermatology.

He studied medicine in Paris, where he received his doctorate in 1893. Later on, he served as laboratory chief at the Hôpital Saint-Louis.

In 1885, Leredde published with François Henri Hallopeau a report on the papular facial rash of tuberous sclerosis, then known as "adénomes sébacés" (adenoma sebaceum). The report also noticed the frequent association of epilepsy with the dermatological condition.

Published works

 L'eczéma, maladie parasitaire nature, pathogénie, diagnostic et traitement, 1898.
 La nature syphilitique et la curabilité du tabes et de la paralysie générale, 1903.
 Photothérapie et photobiologie; rôle thérapeutique et rôle biologique de la lumière (with Lucien-Marie Pautrier), 1903.
 Thérapeutique des maladies de la peau, 1904.
 Études sur le sérodiagnostic et le traitement de la syphilis stratégie et tactique, 1913.
 Un fléau social la syphilis et l'organisation de la lutte antisyphilitique, 1922.

See also
Timeline of tuberous sclerosis

References

1866 births
1926 deaths
French dermatologists
Scientists from Paris